The High Court of Australia building is located on the shore of Lake Burley Griffin in Canberra's Parliamentary Triangle. It is currently the home to the High Court of Australia. The High Court building was designed between 1972 and 1974 by the Australian architect Christopher Kringas (1936–1975), a director of the firm Edwards Madigan Torzillo and Briggs. The building was constructed from 1975 to 1980. Its international architectural significance is recognised by the Union of International Architects register of 'Architectural Heritage of the 20th Century'. It received the Australian Institute of Architects 'Canberra Medallion' in 1980 and the award for 'Enduring Architecture' in 2007. The High Court building was added to the Commonwealth Heritage List in 2004.

History
In the 1950s, Prime Minister Robert Menzies established a plan to develop Canberra and construct other important national buildings. A 1959 plan featured a new building for the High Court on the shore of Lake Burley Griffin, next to the location for the new Parliament House and the National Library of Australia. This plan was abandoned in 1968 and the location of the Parliament was moved, later settling on the present site on Capital Hill. In March 1968, the government announced that the court would move to Canberra.

In 1972, a national, anonymous, two-stage competition was initiated by the National Capital Development Commission, attracting 158 entries. The High Court was to be sited on the eastern edge of a vast, but never realised, 'National Place', centred on the Mahoney-Griffin 'Land Axis'. The competition jury comprised Melbourne architect Daryl Jackson, Chief Justice Sir Garfield Barwick, NCDC Commissioner Sir John Overall, NSW Government Architect Ted Farmer and Australian National University Professor Peter Karmel. In 1973, Prime Minister Gough Whitlam declared the design submitted by the firm of Edwards Madigan Torzillo Briggs the winner, with architect Chris Kringas the principal and director in charge, leading the design team composed of Feiko Bouman, Rod Lawrence (both Stages) and Michael Rolfe (Stage 1).

Architecture
Kringas joined the firm of Edwards Madigan Torzillo Briggs in 1964 and, with Colin Madigan, designed a series of seminal architectural works including the 1967 Dee Why Library, the 1968 and 1971 designs for the Australian National Gallery and the 1971 Warringah Civic Centre, as well as innovative solo designs. Kringas died of cancer in March 1975, aged 38, just 12 days before the High Court construction began. Following his death, architect Hans Marelli continued as the project director until the completion of construction in 1980. Chief Justice Garfield Barwick maintained a keen interest in the building's design and construction. The constructed High Court building is largely identical to the winning 1973 Competition Design.

The High Court building houses three courtrooms, Justices' chambers, and the Court's main registry, library, and corporate services facilities and features an immense public atrium with a  roof. The design is a highly innovative architectural composition that extends the principles of Brutalism – a significant period of post war modern architecture internationally that emerged in the UK in the 1950's. After graduating architecture at the University of NSW in 1959, Kringas travelled to Europe and worked with the London County Council Architect's Department, seen as an epicentre of 'The New Brutalism'.

The building is primarily constructed from bush-hammered reinforced concrete, forming an exposed monolithic structure. The bush-hammering is achieved by constructing the walls using formwork and hammering the concrete when the form work is removed. Large areas of glazing are supported on tubular steel frame structural back-ups. Careful attention has been paid to detailing and the use of controlled natural light in the courtrooms is noteworthy. Internal finishes are rich yet restrained. Flooring is aurisina stone, pirelli rubber or carpet. Wall finishes are concrete, plaster or timber panelling. Ceilings are plywood panelling, timber battened, plaster or concrete. Australian timber is used throughout the building.

Courtroom 1 is the main courtroom with an imposing timber panelled wall of red tulip oak from Queensland, 17.5 metres high. It also contains a long curved bench and bar table of jarrah timber. Blackwood panels are used in the ceiling. The Courtroom has a sound system reticulated to a room which accommodates court reporting services. It contains a woven tapestry incorporating the badges of the States and the Crest of the Commonwealth. Doors for each of the three courtrooms incorporate a special design, those of Courtroom No. 1 featuring a silvered bronze grid partly recessed and fixed into the laminated plate glass. The theme of the design is a shield, emphasising the Court's function as a protector of the Constitution and the liberties of the citizen. The door handles continue the emblematic design. Courtroom No. 2 is described as the "Working Courtroom", as it is the venue for the majority of hearings. It has similar wall panelling and fittings to No. 1 Courtroom, although the ceiling is of painted moulded plywood. Courtroom No 2 is also used for hearing applications for leave to appeal by video link. It therefore is fitted with special equipment for the transmission and reception of pictures and sound between the Courtroom and other cities in Australia. Courtroom No. 3 has been designed for cases which will be dealt with generally by a single Justice and is the smallest of the three courtrooms. It has a jury box so that a trial can be conducted on the rare occasions that such a case comes before the High Court. The Courtroom has been furnished with coachwood timber with a ceiling mainly of glass that provides a high level of natural lighting.

Specially commissioned art works complement the public hall as applied finishes or are integrated into the building's detailing. Included are the water feature designed by Robert Woodward, murals by Jan Senbergs forming an integral part of the public hall, doors at entry to Court 1 designed by Les Kossatz and George Baldessin and a wax mural by Bea Maddock in the public hall outside Courtroom 1. Photographic portraits of all Chief Justices and Justices who have sat on the Court since its inception are displayed along the wall outside Courtroom No. 1.

The building was completed in 1980 and opened by Queen Elizabeth II, on 26 May 1980. The Court and its Principal Registry were immediately transferred to the new building and the first sitting in this location took place in June 1980.  The majority of the court's sittings have been held in Canberra since then.

Gallery

References

Bibliography

External links

 High Court of Australia official website
 High Court Documentary, a short documentary on the High Court and its building.

 
1903 establishments in Australia
1975 Australian constitutional crisis
Australian appellate courts
Australian constitutional law
Australian National Heritage List
Brutalist architecture in Australia
Buildings and structures completed in 1980
Commonwealth Heritage List places in the Australian Capital Territory
Courthouses in Canberra
Law of Nauru
Courts and tribunals established in 1903
Landmarks in Canberra